is a passenger railway station in the city of Jōsō in Ibaraki Prefecture, Japan, operated by the private railway company Kantō Railway.

Lines

Station layout
The station consists of one island platform, connected to the station building by a level crossing. The station building also doubles as the private residence of the station master.

Platforms

Adjacent stations

History
Mitsuma Station was opened on 1 November 1913 as a station on the Jōsō Railroad, which became the Kantō Railway in 1965.

Passenger statistics
In the fiscal year 2017, the station was used by an average of 143 passengers daily.

Surrounding area
 Kanamura Wake Ikazuchi Shrine
 Misaka Post Office

See also
 List of railway stations in Japan

References

External links

  Kantō Railway Station Information 

Railway stations in Ibaraki Prefecture
Railway stations in Japan opened in 1913
Jōsō, Ibaraki